The 1989 Eckerd Open was a women's tennis tournament played on outdoor clay courts in Tampa, Florida in the United States that was part of the Category 3 tier of the 1989 WTA Tour. It was the 17th edition of the tournament and was held from April 17 through April 23, 1989. Eighth-seeded Conchita Martínez won the singles title and earned $40,000 first-prize money.

Finals

Singles

 Conchita Martínez defeated  Gabriela Sabatini 6–3, 6–2
 It was Martínez's 2nd title of the year and the 3rd of her career.

Doubles

 Brenda Schultz /  Andrea Temesvári defeated  Elise Burgin /  Rosalyn Fairbank 7–6(8–6), 6–4
 It was Schultz's only title of the year and the 1st of her career. It was Temesvári's only title of the year and the 9th of her career.

References

External links
 ITF tournament edition details
 Tournament draws

Eckerd Open
Eckerd Open
Eckerd Open
20th century in Tampa, Florida
Sports competitions in Tampa, Florida
Eckerd Open
Eckerd Open